Dolu (also, Doli) is a village and municipality in the Astara Rayon of Azerbaijan.  It has a population of 343.  The municipality consists of the villages of Dolu and Sipiyyəd.

References 

Populated places in Astara District